Golaghat Commerce College is a leading higher education institution established on 9 October 1972 at Jyoti Nagar, Golaghat of the Golaghat district of Upper Assam, India. Affiliated to Dibrugarh University, the college has various departments running Higher Secondary and undergraduate courses both in Commerce and Arts.

History

Golaghat Commerce College was established on 9 October 1972 and classes were started in the premises of D.R.College with assistance from Dr. M.K.Saikia the then principal of D.R. College. The college was shifted to its own temporary building at its permanent site on 2 November 1973. Since then the college has been making strides to its permanent building.

The college is indebted especially to its founder lecturers, members, donors and the public of Golaghat District in general for their generous contribution and help in establishing the college. The founder principal of the college was  P.R. Neog, M.A., L.L.B., who retired on 31 December 1995.

Academics

Besides higher secondary classes for both commerce and arts streams the college offers option for studies at under graduate level (Three Year Degree Course) having career oriented courses and certified courses.

1. Career Oriented Courses : For T.D.C.
 Tourism
 Insurance
 Banking
 e-commerce world trade
 Foreign Exchange
 Retailing

2. Certified Courses : Through RCGC :
 Small Business Management
 Human Resource Management
 Retail Marketing Management

3. B.C.A

4. B.B.A

Departments

There are various academic departments in the college which offer both major and core courses in commerce as well as arts streams. The academic departments of the college are:
Department of Accountancy
Department of Commerce
Department of Human Resource Management
Department of Banking & Insurance
Department of Marketing
Department of Business Management
Department of Computer Science
Department of English
Department of Assamese
Department of Education
Department of Geography
Department of Political Science
Department of History
Department of Mathematics & Statistics
Department of Hindi
Department of Economics
Department of Law

Recognition and accreditation

Golaghat Commerce College has been accredited with grade A by NAAC

References

External links
 Golaghat Commerce College
 College website

Educational institutions established in 1972
Universities and colleges in Golaghat
1972 establishments in Assam